Events in the year 2002 in Greece.

Incumbents

Events

January

February

March

April

May

June

July
 Hellenic Air Force Officer Colonel Georgios Dritsakos becomes Adjutant of S.A., Hellenic Navy Officer Commodore Sotirios Charalampopoulos becomes Adjutant, and Hellenic Army Officer Lieutenant Colonel Dimitrios Reskos becomes Adjutant of the President of the Hellenic Republic Konstantinos Stephanopoulos

August

September

October

November

December

References

 
Years of the 21st century in Greece
Greece
2000s in Greece
Greece